The  is one of a Group of Traditional Buildings in Imai-cho, Kashihara, Nara Prefecture Japan. It dates to 1650 and has been designated an Important Cultural Property.

As well as being the minka or machiya of the Imanishi family, it served as the jinya, or centre and court, of Imai, then an autonomous town.

Its roof is made in the form of "yatsumune-zukuri" (八棟造), which means "complicated roof style with multiple ridges and bargeboards".

References

External links
 The Imanishi of Tochiagatanushi clan Family Residence Preservation Foundation
 Imai-cho

Architecture in Japan
Important Cultural Properties of Japan
Kashihara, Nara
Houses completed in 1650
Museums in Nara Prefecture
Historic house museums in Japan
1650 establishments in Asia